James Ward won the title defeating Adrián Menéndez-Maceiras in the final 6–2, 7–5.

Seeds

Draw

Finals

Top half

Bottom half

References
 Main Draw
 Qualifying Draw

2015 ATP Challenger Tour